Siobhan Wall is a British author, journalist, artist, poet and academic. She is most noted for her series of guides about tranquil places in busy cities, including Quiet London (2011), Quiet Amsterdam (2012), Quiet Paris (2013), Quiet New York (2014),  and Quiet Barcelona (2017). She is an exhibiting artist, exhibition curator and author.  

She studied at Cambridge University and Central St Martin's College of Art and Design, receiving her MA in Visual Culture at Middlesex University, London in 1999.

She was the artist in residence with the Clean Clothes Campaign where she curated its 2002 exhibition The Clothes She Wears, a collection of clothes worn by eight women working in the garment industry. The show toured to Paris, Worthing, Ghent, and Utrecht as well as the Royal Geographical Society and The Fashion and Textile Museum in London.

In her own drawing and paintings she tries to show human vulnerability and discomfort.

References 

English artists
Living people
20th-century travel writers
British travel writers
1961 births